Le Passage Enchanté d'Aladdin (French for Aladdin's Enchanted Passage) is a walkthrough attraction that opened in 1993 inside the Adventureland Bazaar building in Disneyland Paris' Adventureland area. The attraction features a series of showcase windows which recreate scenes from the Disney movie Aladdin.

Summary
 One Jump Ahead: Aladdin, who stole food, is being pursued by the Sultan's guards throughout the City of Agrabah. This window recreates the One Jump Ahead scene from the movie.
 The Magic Lamp: This scene shows the Lamp sitting on top of a rock inside the Cave.
 Aladdin's Home: Aladdin, after escaping the guards, is back home, where he can gaze at the Sultan's Palace and dream of having one of his own.
 Cave of Wonders: Aladdin is reaching for the Tiger-shaped entrance to the Cave. One may notice the Lamp deep inside the Tiger's throat.
 Friend Like Me: Inside the Cave, Aladdin summons the Genie, who appears and delivers his Friend Like Me show from the movie.
 Prince Ali: Aladdin returns to Agrabah, disguised as mighty Prince Ali Ababwa, in order to marry Jasmine. In this scene, everyone in the streets hails to him, except for a raging Jafar who sees him as his rival.
 Snake-like Jafar : In the Palace, Jafar has turned into a gigantic snake, and attacks Aladdin. Jasmine can be seen trapped in the background. 
 Jafar Defeated: Jafar, now a Genie, is swallowed inside his Lamp, taking Iago with him. Jasmine is now free from the sand. The faint-hearted Genie is hiding from the chaos behind a column.
 Farewell: Aladdin and Jasmine soar above Agrabah on the Magic Carpet, under a smiling Moon-shaped Genie, waving guests goodbye. The scene features the song "A Whole New World".

References

Adventureland (Disney)
Amusement rides introduced in 1993
Aladdin (franchise) in amusement parks
Disneyland Park (Paris)
1993 establishments in France